Bathycrinicola is a genus of medium-sized sea snails, marine gastropod molluscs in the family Eulimidae.

Species
Species within this genus include:

 Bathycrinicola curta (Warén, 1972)
 Bathycrinicola fernandinae (Dall, 1927)
 Bathycrinicola macrapex Bouchet & Warén, 1986
 Bathycrinicola media Bouchet & Warén, 1986
 Bathycrinicola micrapex Bouchet & Warén, 1986
 Bathycrinicola nacraensis Peñas & Giribet, 2003
 Bathycrinicola talaena (Dautzenberg & Fischer H., 1897)
 Bathycrinicola tumidula (Thiele, 1912)

References

External links
 Bouchet, P. & Warén, A. (1986). Revision of the Northeast Atlantic bathyal and abyssal Aclididae Eulimidae, Epitonidae (Mollusca, Gastropoda). Bollettino Malacologico. suppl. 2: 297-576

Eulimidae
Gastropod genera